Michael Redhill (born 12 June 1966) is an American-born Canadian poet, playwright and novelist. He also writes under the pseudonym Inger Ash Wolfe.

Early life and education
Redhill was born in Baltimore, Maryland and raised in the metropolitan Toronto, Ontario area. He pursued one year of study at Indiana University, and then returned to Canada, completing his education at York University and the University of Toronto.

Career
Redhill worked on the editorial board of Coach House Press from 1993 to 1996, and was the publisher of the Canadian literary magazine Brick from 2000 to 2009. In 2001 his novel Martin Sloane was shortlisted for the Giller Prize. He won the Giller Prize in 2017 for his novel Bellevue Square.

His newest poetry book, Twitch Force, was published in 2019.

Work as Inger Ash Wolfe
In 2012, Redhill revealed that he is also the author of novels published under the pen name Inger Ash Wolfe, described by the publishers of Wolfe's 2008 mystery as a pseudonym for a "well-known and well-regarded North American literary novelist".  The pseudonym was originally to be Inger Wolf until it was recognized that a Danish crime writer already uses that name.

As Wolfe, Redhill published his first mystery novel The Calling in 2008, released simultaneously in Canada, the United States and the United Kingdom. While the book received good reviews, speculation as to the author's real identity played a large role in many of them. Canadian reviewers suggested Linda Spalding, Michael Redhill, Jane Urquhart and David Adams Richards, among others. American reviewers suggested Margaret Atwood, and Farley Mowat.  The second novel by Wolfe, The Taken, was published in 2010. The third, A Door in the River, was published in 2012. Each of the books features series detective Hazel Micallef. The fourth novel in the series, The Night Bell, was published in 2015. In August 2014, a film version of The Calling was released, starring Susan Sarandon as Hazel Micallef.

Publications

Poetry
 Music for Silence (self-published, 1985)
 Temporary Captives (privately published, 1989)
 Impromptu Feats of Balance (Don Mills, ON: Wolsak and Wynn, 1990)
 Lake Nora Arms (Toronto: Coach House, 1993; reissued by House of Anansi, 2001)
 Asphodel (Toronto: McClelland and Stewart, 1997)
 Light-Crossing (Toronto: House of Anansi, 2001)
 Twitch Force (Toronto: House of Anansi, 2019)

Fiction
 Martin Sloane (Toronto: Doubleday Canada, 2001)
 Fidelity (Toronto: Doubleday Canada, 2003)
 Consolation (Toronto: Doubleday Canada, 2006)
 Bellevue Square (Toronto: Doubleday Canada, 2017)

Fiction as Inger Ash Wolfe
 The Calling (Toronto: McClelland & Stewart, 2008)
 The Taken (Toronto: McClelland & Stewart, 2010)
 A Door in the River (Toronto: McClelland & Stewart, 2012)
 The Night Bell (Toronto: McClelland & Stewart, 2015)

Drama
 Heretics (privately published, 1993)
 Building Jerusalem (Toronto: Playwrights Union Canada, 2001)
 Goodness (Toronto: Coach House, 2005)

Anthologies
 Discord of Flags (privately published, 1992) (co-editor)
 Blues and True Conclusions (Toronto: House of Anansi, 1996)
 Lost Classics (Toronto: Knopf Canada, 2000) (edited with Esta Spalding, Michael Ondaatje and Linda Spalding)

Awards

Building Jerusalem
Winner of the Dora Award, Best New Play, 2000
Winner of the Chalmers Award, 2001
Nominated for the Governor General's Award for Drama, 2001

Martin Sloane
Winner of the Books in Canada First Novel Award, 2001
Winner of the Commonwealth Writers Prize (Canadian-Caribbean Region), 2002
Nominated for the Giller Prize, 2001
Nominated for the City of Toronto Book Award, 2002
Nominated for the Trillium Book Award, 2002
Nominated for the Torgi/CNIB Award, 2002

Consolation
Winner of the City of Toronto Book Award, 2007
Longlisted for the Man Booker Prize, 2007

Bellevue Square
Won the Scotiabank Giller Prize, 2017

Other awards
The League of Canadian Poets National Poetry Contest, first prize, 1988
Norma Epstein Award for poetry (University of Toronto), 1990
The E.J. Pratt Prize for poetry (University of Toronto), 1991
The Carol Tambor Best of Edinburgh Award, for Goodness, 2006
Scotsman Fringe First Award, (Edinburgh Festival Fringe), 2006

Personal life
Redhill has two sons and lives in Toronto.

He had  left in his bank account when he cashed the  Giller Prize cheque for Bellevue Square.

References

External links
Brick, A Literary Journal

1966 births
Living people
20th-century Canadian dramatists and playwrights
21st-century Canadian dramatists and playwrights
21st-century Canadian novelists
20th-century Canadian poets
Canadian male poets
Canadian male novelists
Canadian male short story writers
Dora Mavor Moore Award winners
University of Toronto alumni
Canadian mystery writers
Canadian male dramatists and playwrights
21st-century Canadian short story writers
20th-century Canadian short story writers
20th-century Canadian male writers
21st-century Canadian male writers
Amazon.ca First Novel Award winners